Dubal is a surname. Notable people with the surname include:

 David Dubal, American pianist, teacher, author, lecturer, broadcaster and painter
 Dena Dubal, American neuroscientist
 Veena Dubal, American lawyer and scholar

See also
Dural (surname)
Duval